Deh Divan (also Romanized as Deh Dīvān and Deh-e Dīvān) is a village in Rabor Rural District, in the Central District of Rabor County, Kerman Province, Iran. At the 2006 census, its population was 182, in 38 families.

References 

Populated places in Rabor County